Motibaug Stadium is a cricket stadium located in Vadodara, Gujarat.

The ground form part of the Lakshmi Vilas Palace building complex - a sprawling  complex in the heart of the city. The palace and the stadium, earlied belonged to the former rulers of Baroda and the patrons of cricket in Baroda - the Gaekwad.

The stadium has a seating capacity of 18,000 people. The use of the stadium for International cricket has been discontinued in favour of IPCL Sports Complex Ground.

List of Centuries

Key
 * denotes that the batsman was not out.
 Inns. denotes the number of the innings in the match.
 Balls denotes the number of balls faced in an innings.
 NR denotes that the number of balls was not recorded.
 Parentheses next to the player's score denotes his century number at Edgbaston.
 The column title Date refers to the date the match started.
 The column title Result refers to the player's team result

One Day Internationals

List of Five Wicket Hauls

Key

One Day Internationals

References

External links
Motibaug Cricket Ground History
Cricinfo Website - Ground Page

Cricket grounds in Gujarat
Sport in Vadodara
Buildings and structures in Vadodara
Sports venues completed in 1956
1956 establishments in Bombay State
1996 Cricket World Cup stadiums
20th-century architecture in India